This is a list of major sport stadiums in Pakistan.

Current grounds

See also
 List of cricket grounds in Pakistan
 List of hockey stadiums in Pakistan
 List of sports venues in Karachi
 List of sports venues in Lahore
 List of sports venues in Faisalabad
 List of stadiums by capacity

References

 
Pakistan